The Laurie Beechman Theatre (formerly the West Bank Cafe Downstairs Theater Bar) is an 80-seat dinner theater in the basement of the West Bank Cafe at 407 West 42nd Street in the Manhattan Plaza apartment complex in Hell's Kitchen, Manhattan, New York City.

The theater is named for Laurie Beechman, who was a Broadway singer/actor and cabaret performer.

History
The theater was opened in 1983 by the West Bank Cafe owner Steve Olsen. The cafe/theater is in Manhattan Plaza, which was specifically built to house people who are active in New York's theater scene. Bruce Willis was a bartender in the restaurant. Tennessee Williams, Arthur Miller and Sean Penn were regulars.

Olsen experimented with the venue, offering it for jazz and cabaret. Lewis Black, Rand Foerster, and Rusty Magee proposed staging plays at what initially was called the West Bank Cafe Downstairs Theater Bar.  Over the course of 14 years, Foerster was the Artistic Director, Black was the playwright in residence, and authored forty plays there, and Magee was the musical director. More than 1,500 one-act plays have been performed at the theater.

Initially, the theater was strictly drinks only. However, it has evolved to include dinner before the show. Joan Rivers often performed there, as has Karen Finley.

On August 27, 2014, Joan Rivers gave her final performance at the theatre. The following day, Rivers suffered a cardiac arrest resulting from complications during a procedure on her vocal cords, and died on September 4, 2014.

On Christmas day 2020 the Cafe ran on a telethon to raise the funds needed to stay open. Among the notable performers and other luminaries who appeared on the marathon program were Matthew Broderick, Al Pacino, Betty Buckley, Nathan Lane, André De Shields, Marissa Mulder, Pete Townshend, and the Manhattan Borough President Gale Brewer. 
The telethon raised its target of $250,000 within the first ninety minutes of the show.

See also
 List of dinner theaters

References

External links
westbankcafe.com
Laurie Beechman Theatre at the Internet Off-Broadway Database (incomplete)

Theatres completed in 1983
Dinner theatre
Nightclubs in Manhattan
Theatres in Manhattan
Hell's Kitchen, Manhattan
1983 establishments in New York City
42nd Street (Manhattan)